

Great Western Railway
Engineer to the Great Western Railway
 Isambard Kingdom Brunel (1833-1837)

Locomotive Superintendent
 Daniel Gooch (1837–1864)
 Joseph Armstrong (1864–1877)
 William Dean (1877–1902)
 George Jackson Churchward (1902–1915)

Chief Mechanical Engineer
 George Jackson Churchward (1915–1921)
 Charles Collett (1922–1941)
 Frederick Hawksworth (1941–1947)

Northern Division Locomotive Superintendent
 Joseph Armstrong (1854–1864)
 George Armstrong (1864–1892)

British Railways (Western Region)
Mechanical and Electrical Engineer
 Kenneth J Cook (1950–1951)
 Robert A Smeddle (1951–?)

Constituent companies
Birkenhead Railway
 John Dixon
 T A Yarrow
 Rendell
 William Bragge
 George Douglas (1851–1860)

Bristol and Exeter Railway
 Charles Gregory (1849–1850) (Chief Engineer)
 James Pearson (1850–1875)

Cornwall Minerals Railway
 Miles Constatine

Llanelly Railway
 Joseph Hepburn
 Robert Hepburn

Llynvi and Ogmore Railway
 J Routledge

Monmouthshire Railway
 W Craig (1849–1854)
 R Laybourne (1854–1868)
 H Appleby (1868–1875)

Shrewsbury and Birmingham Railway
 William Marlow (1849–1853)
 Edmund Petre
 Joseph Armstrong

Shrewsbury and Chester Railway
 A M Ross (Engineer)
 Thomas Truss (Carriage Superintendent)
 Edward Jeffreys
 Joseph Armstrong (1853–1854)

South Devon Railway;
 Frederick Gooch (1850–1864)
 Joseph Wright (1864–1876)

Vale of Neath Railway
 Joshua Williams (1851–1865) (General Manager)

West Cornwall Railway
 Skater
 H Appleby
 Joseph Wright (South Devon Railway Locomotive Superintendent)

West Midland Railway
 Edward Wilson (1860–1863)

Newport, Abergavenny and Hereford Railway
 Mark Carr (1854–1858)
 Alexander McDonnell (1858–1860)

Oxford, Worcester and Wolverhampton Railway
 David Joy (1852–1856)
 Frederic Haward (1856–1857)
 Edward Wilson (1857–1860)

References

 
 
British railway-related lists